The Battle of Čegar, also known as the Battle of Kamenica (Бој на Каменици/Boj na Kamenici) was a battle of the First Serbian Uprising between the Serbian Revolutionaries and Ottoman forces near the Niš Fortress on 31 May 1809. Fought on the Čegar hill situated between the villages of Donji Matejevac and Kamenica near Niš in what is today southeastern Serbia, it ended in an Ottoman victory. Commander Stevan Sinđelić famously blew up the gunpowder magazine when the Ottomans overtook his trench, killing everyone in it. Skulls of dead Serb rebels were embedded into the Skull Tower.

Background
On April 15, 1809, the 10,000 Serbian rebels approached the villages of Kamenica, Donji and Gornji Matejevac, near the Fortress of Niš with Miloje Petrović as Commander-in-chief. They made six trenches. The first and the biggest one was on Čegar Hill in charge of vojvoda Stevan Sinđelić. The second one was in the village Gornji Matejevac with Petar Dobrnjac as the commander. The third trench was north-east to Kamenica with vojvoda Ilija Barjaktarović. The fourth trench was in Kamenica with Miloje Petrović as the chief commander. The fifth trench was in the mountain above Kamenica and under the control of vojvoda Paulj Matejić while the sixth one was in Donji Matejevac. The Ottoman commander of the fortress was Hurshid Pasha who had 8,000 troops in the fort and the surrounding area. The Serbs then launched several attacks against the Niš Fortress, but they could not take the fort due to lack of heavy artillery. In such circumstances, their strategy was to force Hursid Pasha to surrender with the long siege. But Hurshid had different tactics; after every Serbian attack, he was offered negotiations and this way he bought time while fresh troops arrived.

Meanwhile, on 20 May the Ottoman army was reinforced with 20,000 soldiers from Rumelia. One Ottoman unit then tried to surround the Serbian troops, 30 km east of the town. Hajduk-Veljko and his 2,000 soldiers then left their position, and moved to prevent the Ottoman attack from their rear approach. This manoeuvre further weakened Serbian positions on the main front line.

The Ottoman troops attacked on the trench of Petar Dobrnjac on 30 May. The following day, on 31 May 1809, the most prominent trench at Čegar Hill, under the command of Stevan Sinđelić, was under attack.

Battle
The battle lasted for the whole day. Stevan and his unit became separated from the remainder of the Serb guerrilla positions and he and his men resisted fiercely. With hundreds of Ottoman soldiers pouring into the trench, Stevan saw that his Brigade had little hope of staving off the Ottoman offensive. Hand-to-hand combat ensued in the trenches. Stevan decided to fire his flintlock pistol into a pile of gunpowder kegs. When the Ottomans swarmed the trench from all sides and headed for him, Sinđelić squeezed the trigger.  As Milovan Kukić witnessed:

It was earlier believed that the Serbian defeat at Kamenica was due to Miloje Trnavac, a commander of the Niš front.

Aftermath

The fall of Sinđelić's trench forced the other Serbian units to retreat back to the town of Deligrad, where they entrenched themselves in a new, fortified front line. When Hurshid Pasha realized this, even though the post at Čegar hill had been taken, he ordered that the heads of the Serb victims be collected, skinned, and that the skulls be built into the "Skull Tower". This tower was built along the road to Constantinople, as a warning to anyone revolting against the Ottoman Empire. The Serbian defeat meant the loss of initiative in the war, which lasted until 1813. Thousands of Serbian revolutionaries and Ottoman troops were killed on Čegar Hill. In 1815 the Second Serbian Uprising began under the leadership of Miloš Obrenović.

Gallery

References

Sources

Further reading

Vukićević, M. (1909) Kamenička pogibija 19. maja 1809. godine i njeni uzroci. Ratnik, jul, 979

Cegar
Conflicts in 1809
First Serbian Uprising
1809 in Serbia
History of Niš
May 1809 events